Year 1439 (MCDXXXIX) was a common year starting on Thursday (link will display the full calendar) of the Julian calendar.

Events 
 January–December 
 May 4 – Battle of Grotnik: Władysław III's royal army defeats the Hussite movement in Poland.
 June 29 – Date of Venerable Macarius' Miracle of the Moose, according to Russian hagiographers.
 July 6 – Pope Eugene IV issues the Bull of Union with the Greeks, proclaiming the end of the East–West Schism. The bull is repudiated by most eastern bishops shortly thereafter.
 September 8 – Cardinal Giovanni Vitelleschi captures Foligno, ending Trinci's signoria.
 September 29 or October 1 – Eric of Pomerania, King of Sweden, Denmark and Norway, is declared deposed in Sweden. Karl Knutsson Bonde continues to serve as Regent of Sweden.
 November 12 – In England, Plymouth becomes the first town incorporated by the English Parliament.

 Date unknown 
 Johannes Gutenberg develops printing with movable type at Mainz at about this date.
 The Great Ordinance is adopted by the French Estates-General. This measure grants the king the exclusive right to raise troops, and establishes the taxation measure known as the taille, in support of a standing army.
 The Council of Florence is moved to Florence.
 At the Portuguese Cortes, Peter, Duke of Coimbra is appointed Regent of the Kingdom.

Births 
 March 3 – Ashikaga Yoshimi, brother of Shōgun Ashikaga Yoshimasa (d. 1491)
 April 3 – Ludwig II, Count of Württemberg-Urach, German noble (d. 1457)
 May 29 – Pope Pius III (d. 1503)
 July 18 – John V, Duke of Saxe-Lauenburg, German duke (d. 1507)
 July 26 – Sigismund, Duke of Bavaria, member of the Wittelsbach dynasty (d. 1501)
 August 10 – Anne of York, Duchess of Exeter, Duchess of York, second child of Richard Plantagenet (d. 1476)
 date unknown – Hua Sui, Chinese inventor and printer (d. 1513)

Deaths 
 April 30 – Richard de Beauchamp, 13th Earl of Warwick, English military leader (b. 1382)
 June 24 – Duke Frederick IV of Austria (b. 1382)
 September 12 – Sidi El Houari, Algerian imam (b. 1350) 
 October 20 – Ambrose the Camaldulian, Italian theologian
 October 27 – Albert II of Germany, Holy Roman Emperor (b. 1397)
 December 30 – Margaret Holland, English noblewoman (b. 1385)

References